Shi-Ting Wang was the defending champion and won in the final 6–4, 6–0 against Nana Miyagi.

Seeds
A champion seed is indicated in bold text while text in italics indicates the round in which that seed was eliminated.

  Sandrine Testud (second round)
  Shi-Ting Wang (champion)
  Alexandra Fusai (first round)
  Nana Miyagi (final)
  Sarah Pitkowski (quarterfinals)
  Ludmila Richterová (quarterfinals)
  Francesca Lubiani (first round)
  Nathalie Dechy (quarterfinals)

Draw

External links
 1996 Wismilak International Draw

Commonwealth Bank Tennis Classic
1996 WTA Tour